Twelve teams competed in the women's football tournament at the 2012 Summer Olympics. In addition to the United Kingdom, the host nation, 11 women's national teams qualified from six separate continental confederations.

Table

Locations are those of final tournaments, various qualification stages may precede matches at these specific venues.

AFC

Japan and North Korea earned Olympic qualification places by finishing in the top two of the final round.

First round

Second round

Final round

CAF

Cameroon and South Africa earned Olympic qualification places by winning their final round ties.

First round

Second round

Third round

Final round

CONCACAF

The United States and Canada earned Olympic qualification places by winning their semi-final matches.

Preliminary round

Caribbean Zone

Ranking of second-placed teams

Central American Zone

Group stage

Knockout stage

CONMEBOL

Brazil and Colombia earned Olympic qualification places by finishing in the top two of the second round of the South American Women's Football Championship.

First stage

Second stage

OFC

New Zealand earned an Olympic qualification place by winning their final round tie.

First stage

Round-robin

Knockout round

Final stage

UEFA

France and Sweden earned Olympic qualification places by finishing as the best UEFA teams in the 2011 FIFA Women's World Cup.

References

 
Women